The 2000 United States Senate election in Delaware was held on November 7, 2000, in conjunction with the 2000 U.S. presidential election, other elections to the United States Senate in other states, as well as elections to the United States House of Representatives, and various state and local elections. Incumbent Republican U.S. Senator William Roth ran for re-election to a sixth term, but he was defeated by outgoing Democratic Governor Tom Carper. Carper subsequently became the first Democrat to hold this seat since 1947. It was also the first time since 1943 that both seats were held by Democrats.

General election

Candidates
 Tom Carper, Governor of Delaware and former U.S. Representative (Democratic)
Mark E. Dankof (Constitution)
Robert Mattson (Natural Law)
J. Burke Morrison (Libertarian)
 William Roth, incumbent U.S. Senator since 1971 (Republican)

Campaign
For 16 years, the same four people had held all four major statewide positions in Delaware. Governor Tom Carper was term-limited and could not run for re-election again. Both he and U.S. Representative Michael Castle wanted to be U.S. Senator. However, Roth would not retire, and fellow Republican Castle decided against a primary.

Roth, 79, had served in the U.S. Senate for 30 years. He was the Chairman of the Finance Committee. Carper, 53, was a popular Governor and former U.S. Congressman of Delaware's At-large congressional district, who announced his candidacy against Roth in September 1999. Both candidates were moderates. Roth was one of the few Republicans to vote for the Brady Bill. Although Roth started the campaign with a 2-to-1 spending advantage, Carper went into the final month with more than $1 million on hand. In a contest between two popular and respected politicians, the main issue seemed to be Roth's age versus Carper's relative youth.

Debates
Complete video of debate, October 15, 2000

Results
Carper defeated Roth by over ten points. Roth received more votes than Presidential candidate George W. Bush, suggesting the strength of the Democratic turnout was a boon to Carper's candidacy. Some attributed Roth's loss to his age and health, as he collapsed twice during the campaign, once in the middle of a television interview and once during a campaign event.

See also 
 2000 United States Senate elections

References 

2000
Delaware
2000 Delaware elections